Max Green (born 13 February 1996) is an English professional rugby union player who plays as a scrum-half for Bath Rugby.

Club career
Green made his debut for Yorkshire Carnegie during the 2015/16 campaign and became a regular the following season. In November 2017 he signed for Bath. Green played for Bath in the Anglo-Welsh Cup making his club debut against London Irish at the Madejski Stadium in 2017.

In March 2021, he was loaned to RFU Championship side Jersey Reds for the remainder of the 2020–21 season and made seven appearances. (after breaking leg and surgery in Jan 2020 and surgery on wrist in Oct 2019)

International career
Green qualifies to represent Sweden through his mother's side and represented Sweden Under-18 in two FIRA tournaments, 2013 and 2014.

Green was a member of the England under-20 team that hosted the 2016 World Rugby Under 20 Championship and scored a try in the semi-final against South Africa. He started in the final as England defeated Ireland to win the tournament.

Miscellaneous
2015 BUCS University Champions with Leeds Beckett University. 2016 BUCS University Player of the Year. Yorkshire County Rugby.

Other Sports:

Blackburn Rovers Academy and Bradford City Football Academy. Bradford School Boys (football).

U15 West Yorkshire 100m Champion.

U16 Yorkshire Cricket.

References

1996 births
Living people
Bath Rugby players
Leeds Tykes players
English people of Swedish descent
English rugby union players
Alumni of Leeds Beckett University
People educated at Prince Henry's Grammar School, Otley
People educated at Woodhouse Grove School
Rugby union players from Bradford
Rugby union scrum-halves